5430 Luu, provisional designation , is a stony Phocaea asteroid from the inner regions of the asteroid belt, approximately 7 kilometers in diameter. It was discovered on 12 May 1988, by American astronomer couple Carolyn and Eugene Shoemaker at Palomar Observatory, California, and later named after astronomer Jane Luu.

Orbit and classification 

Luu is a member of the Phocaea family. It orbits the Sun in the inner main-belt at a distance of 1.8–2.9 AU once every 3 years and 8 months (1,328 days). Its orbit has an eccentricity of 0.22 and an inclination of 24° with respect to the ecliptic. The first precovery was taken at Crimea–Nauchnij in 1970, extending the asteroid's observation arc by 18 years prior to its discovery.

Physical characteristics 

Luu has been characterized as a common S-type asteroid.

Rotation period 

In April 2006, photometric observations of Luu collected by American astronomer Brian D. Warner at his Palmer Divide Station, Colorado, show a rotation period of  hours with a brightness variation of  magnitude. A second, tentative lightcurve was obtained by French astronomer René Roy in July 2007. It gave a period of  hours and an amplitude of 0.05 in magnitude.

Diameter and albedo 

According to the surveys carried out by the Japanese Akari satellite and NASA's Wide-field Infrared Survey Explorer with its subsequent NEOWISE mission, Luu measures 6.5 and 8.3 kilometers in diameter and its surface has an albedo between 0.21 and 0.26.

The Collaborative Asteroid Lightcurve Link assumes an albedo of 0.23 – derived from 25 Phocaea, the family's most massive member and namesake – and calculates a diameter of 7.6 kilometers with an absolute magnitude of 12.8.

Naming 

This minor planet is named in honor of Vietnamese-American astronomer Jane X. Luu (born 1963) for her research and discovering the first and subsequent members of the Kuiper Belt. She also studied the physical properties of these bodies and the coma of potentially Extinct comets. The approved naming citation was published by the Minor Planet Center on 1 July 1996.

References

External links 
 Lightcurve plot of 5430 Luu, Palmer Divide Observatory, B. D. Warner (2006)
 Asteroid Lightcurve Database (LCDB), query form (info )
 Dictionary of Minor Planet Names, Google books
 Asteroids and comets rotation curves, CdR – Observatoire de Genève, Raoul Behrend
 Discovery Circumstances: Numbered Minor Planets (5001)-(10000) – Minor Planet Center
 
 

 

005430
Discoveries by Carolyn S. Shoemaker
Discoveries by Eugene Merle Shoemaker
Named minor planets
19880512